Jon Bond (born 1957) is an advertising executive, author and entrepreneur in New York City.

Career
In 1987, at the age of 29, Jon Bond co-founded Kirshenbaum Bond + Partners, a New York City advertising agency that pioneered guerilla marketing techniques including sidewalk advertising, popup stores, and other forms of what would eventually come to be known as viral marketing. The firm became the largest independently held agency in the United States, with clients including BMW, Target, Citi, Capital One, Tommy Hilfiger, Victoria's Secret, Verizon, AT&T, Snapple, and Delta Air Lines, among others. At the time of its sale to MDC Partners in 2009, the firm had billings of $1BB. New York Magazine profiled Kirshenbaum + Bond in 1987, two months after its creation, the firm was featured in a 2005 episode of Paris and Nicole Hilton's The Simple Life, and it was referenced in the 2007 film Perfect Stranger.

In 1996, Bond went on to co-found iballs, one of the first digital media agencies, which was sold to Avenue A, which was then acquired by Microsoft. In 2011, he became the CEO of Big Fuel Communications, a marketing, content distribution, and social media company that served clients including GM, Gatorade, T-Mobile, McDonald's, Budweiser, Yahoo! and more. The company was acquired by Publicis in 2012.

Bond is currently the "Chief Tomorroist" at Tomorro LLC, a company that provides financial and strategic advice for new and growing businesses of high potential value.

Following the Sandy Hook Elementary School shooting in December 2012, he and his wife, Rebecca, founded Evolve, an organization intended to facilitate dialogue between opposing sides of the debate over gun ownership.

Bond has appeared on CNN, The Today Show, and 20/20, and played a central role in the Fox News network special Sex, Lies and Advertising. In 2010, he gave the keynote speech at the National Association of Broadcasters' Advertiser Luncheon. He has been featured in Forbes Online and Ad Age. He also appeared in the 2011 Morgan Spurlock film The Greatest Movie Ever Sold.

Bond is an advisor for Appinions Inc., DataXu, Metamorphic Ventures, and Smarterer, Inc. He has served as a board member of the AAAA (American Association of Advertising Agencies), Ad Council, and AdWeek, and was the chairman of the board of Worldwide Partners, the world's largest network of independent ad agencies. He was named #4 in Adweek's "Agency Executive of the Decade" in 2010. He is also a board member of the charity organization God's Love We Deliver.

Writing
In 1997, Bond published Under the Radar, co-written with colleague Richard Kirshenbaum. The book, which showcased innovative and effective marketing techniques, was translated into five languages.

He is also an occasional contributor to The Huffington Post.

Personal life
He is married to Rebecca Bond and has five children; Alex & Matthew (from a prior marriage), Remy, Olivia (featured on Master Chef Junior season 6, Harry Potter on Broadway) and Damien. A Page Six article in the New York Post showcases their home in Greenwich Village.

References

20th-century American businesspeople
21st-century American businesspeople
Living people
American motivational writers
Businesspeople from New York City
American advertising executives
Writers from Manhattan
1958 births
Washington University in St. Louis alumni
People from Greenwich Village